Synaptic plasticity refers to a chemical synapse's ability to undergo changes in strength. Synaptic plasticity is typically input-specific (i. e. homosynaptic plasticity), meaning that the activity in a particular neuron alters the efficacy of a synaptic connection between that neuron and its target. However, in the case of heterosynaptic plasticity, the activity of a particular neuron leads to input unspecific changes in the strength of synaptic connections from other unactivated neurons. A number of distinct forms of heterosynaptic plasticity have been found in a variety of brain regions and organisms.  These different forms of heterosynaptic plasticity contribute to a variety of neural processes including associative learning, the development of neural circuits, and homeostasis of synaptic input.

Homeostatic role 
Heterosynaptic plasticity may play an important homeostatic role in neural plasticity by normalizing or limiting the total change of synaptic input during ongoing Hebbian plasticity. 
Hebbian plasticity, an ubiquitous form of homosynaptic, associative plasticity, is believed to underlie learning and memory. Moreover, Hebbian plasticity is induced by and amplifies correlations in neural circuits which creates a positive feedback loop and renders neural circuits unstable. To avoid this instability Hebbian plasticity needs to be constrained, for instance by the conservation of the total amount of synaptic input. This role  is believed to be fulfilled by a diversity of homeostatic mechanisms.

However, to effectively stabilize Hebbian plasticity, which can be induced in a matter of seconds to minutes, homeostatic plasticity has to react rapidly. This requirement, however, is not met by most forms of homeostatic plasticity, which typically act on timescales of hours, days or longer.

This limitation does not seem to apply to heterosynaptic plasticity.

To achieve a homeostatic effect, heterosynaptic plasticity serving a homeostatic role have to cause pathway unspecific synaptic changes in the opposite direction as Hebbian plasticity. In other words, whenever homosynaptic long-term potentiation is induced at a given synapse, other unstimulated synapses should be depressed. Conversely, homosynaptic long-term depression would cause other synapses to potentiate in a manner which keeps the average synaptic weight approximately conserved. The scope of these changes could be global or compartmentalized in the dendrites.

Modulatory input-dependent plasticity 

One well studied example of heterosynaptic plasticity is modulatory input-dependent plasticity.  Modulatory neurons perform neuromodulation, which is the release of neuromodulators.  Neuromodulators differ from classical neurotransmitters. Typically, neuromodulators do not directly generate electrical responses in target neurons.  Rather, the release of neuromodulators often alters the efficacy of neurotransmission in nearby chemical synapses.  Furthermore, the impact of neuromodulators is often quite long lasting in comparison to classical neurotransmitters.

A number of neurotransmitters can act as neuromodulators, particularly biogenic amines such as dopamine and serotonin. These neuromodulators use G-protein coupled receptors which mediate slower modulatory effects and neither hyperpolarize nor depolarize cells. Due to these qualities, GPCR can initiate long-lasting changes in heterosynaptic strength.

The use of these neuromodulators is an example of heterosynaptic plasticity. Released by a neuron called an interneuron, neuromodulators can affect another neuron's efficiency of communication with a postsynaptic cell. Thus, because the interneuron does not specifically activate the postsynaptic neuron (strength in its synaptic plasticity is indirectly affected), this mechanism of modulatory input-dependent plasticity is heterosynaptic. To better understand this process and its vast diversity, key functions of the neuromodulator serotonin in Aplysia californica and dopamine are further illustrated.

Aplysia californica

The classic example that demonstrates modulatory input-dependent plasticity involves the marine mollusk, Aplysia californica. Studies in the late 1960s provided the first evidence for plasticity in the chemical synapses of Aplysia. These studies showed that several types of modulatory interneurons were excited in the sensory and motor neuron circuit of Aplysia. In Aplysia, stimulation of the siphon sensory neuron terminals led to an enhanced EPSP in the modulatory interneuron. The modulatory interneurons release serotonin, which triggers synaptic plasticity in motor neurons. Furthermore, when a noxious stimulus was  applied to either the head or tail and paired with a light touch to the siphon, it produced a strong motor response, called gill withdrawal reflex. Evidence for long-term plasticity changes was observed several days later when only a light touch to the siphon elicited the same strong response due to a phenomenon called sensitization. These studies show evidence for heterosynaptic strengthening between sensory and motor neurons in Aplysia motor circuitry.

Dopaminergic synapses
Heterosynaptic plasticity is not solely restricted to serotonin. Dopamine has also been shown to act in a neuro modulatory fashion. Much like the serotonin receptors in Aplysia, dopamine receptors are G-protein-coupled receptors that activate cAMP production. This process, however, is important for the storage of memories in mammals, while serotonin's occurs in invertebrates. Within dopaminergic and GABAergic terminals, the neuromodulator dopamine is released via heterosynaptic plasticity. Commonly, this plasticity leads to long-term depression, LTD, mediated by dopamine D1 class receptors. These receptors' activation is required to create LTD and modulate its magnitude. Further research on dopamine's role in neuromodulation is also underway. Experiments performed at the University of Pittsburgh looked at the parallel projects of dopaminergic and GABAergic terminals from the ventral tegmental area to the nucleus accumbens core (NAcCo) in rats. Within these parallel projections, scientists discovered that the release of dopamine heterosynaptically triggers LTD at these synapses. Concluding, dopamine is not just a neuromodulator but can also trigger synaptic plasticity independently in neurons. Therefore, heterosynaptic dopamine signaling in mammals can be best represented by dopamine's biological functions of mediating, as well as independently triggering, changes in synaptic plasticity.

Changes in plasticity during development
Early in development, synaptic connections are not input-specific, most likely because of Ca2+ spillover (i.e. Ca2+ is not restricted to dendrites specifically activated). This spillover represents another mechanism of heterosynaptic change in plasticity. Networks are later refined by input-specific plasticity, which allows for the elimination of connections that are not specifically stimulated. As neuronal circuits mature, it is likely that the concentration of Ca2+ binding proteins increases, which prevents Ca2+ from diffusing to other sites.  Increases in localized Ca2+ lead to AMPARs inserted into the membrane. This increase in AMPA density in the postsynaptic membrane increases enables NMDARs to be functional, allowing more Ca2+ to enter the cell. NMDAR subunits also change as neurons mature, increasing the receptor's conductance property. These mechanisms facilitate Ca2+ location restriction, and thus specificity, as an organism progresses through development.

Synaptic Scaling
A neural network that undergoes plastic changes between synapses must initiate normalization mechanisms in order to combat unrestrained potentiation or depression. One mechanism assures that the average firing rate of these neurons is kept at a reasonable rate through synaptic scaling. In this process, input levels are changed in cells to maintain average firing rate. For example, inhibitory synapses are strengthened or excitatory synapses are weakened to normalize the neural network and allow single neurons to regulate their firing rate.
Another mechanism is the cell-wide redistribution of synaptic weight. This mechanism conserves the total synaptic weight across the cell by introducing competition between synapses. Thus, normalizing a single neuron after plasticity. During development, cells can be refined when some synapses are preserved and others are discarded to normalize total synaptic weight. In this way, homeostasis is conserved in cells that are undergoing plasticity and normal operation of learning networks is also preserved, allowing new information to be learned.

References

Memory
Neuroplasticity
Neurology